José Iván Vélez Castillo (born August 16, 1984) is a Colombian footballer who plays as a full back for Categoría Primera A club América de Cali .

International career

Vélez debuted with the Colombia national team in 2009.

External links

1984 births
Living people
Colombian footballers
Colombia international footballers
Deportes Quindío footballers
América de Cali footballers
Club Atlético Independiente footballers
Atlético Junior footballers
Once Caldas footballers
Categoría Primera A players
Argentine Primera División players
Colombian expatriate footballers
Expatriate footballers in Argentina
Association football fullbacks
People from Palmira, Valle del Cauca
Sportspeople from Valle del Cauca Department
21st-century Colombian people